Ralph Robertson may refer to:

People 
Ralph Robertson (Australian footballer) (1881–1917), Australian rules footballer
Ralph Robertson (soccer), American soccer player